Barwidgi is a rural locality in the Shire of Mareeba, Queensland, Australia.

Geography
The Tate River forms most of the northern boundary. The Rocky Tate River and the Sandy Tate River both flow through the locality on their way to join the Tate.

Ootann Road runs through from north to south-east.

The Tablelands railway line passes through the locality, which is served by the following railway stations:

 Gelaro railway station

 Bullock Creek railway station

References 

Shire of Mareeba
Localities in Queensland